The 2020-21 Vermont Catamounts men's ice hockey season was the 58th season of play for the program, the 48th at the Division I level, and the 37th season in the Hockey East conference. The Catamounts represented the University of Vermont and were coached by Todd Woodcroft, in his 1st season.

Season
As a result of the ongoing COVID-19 pandemic the entire college ice hockey season was delayed. Because the NCAA had previously announced that all winter sports athletes would retain whatever eligibility they possessed through at least the following year, none of Vermont's players would lose a season of play. However, the NCAA also approved a change in its transfer regulations that would allow players to transfer and play immediately rather than having to sit out a season, as the rules previously required.

Vermont's first season under Todd Woodcroft could hardly have gone worse. Aside from the problems caused by the pandemic, the team's offense was nearly invisible for most of the year. The Catamounts only once scored more than 3 goals (their only win on the season), and were shut out on three separate occasions, a little less than a quarter of their games. One silver lining was that most of the teams they faces were ranked and Vermont is in the process of rebuilding after an abysmal season the year before.

Azzaro Tinling and Whim Stålberg sat out the season.

Departures

Recruiting

Roster
As of February 12, 2021.

|}

Standings

Schedule and results

|-
!colspan=12 style=";" | Regular Season

|-
!colspan=12 style=";" |

Scoring statistics

Goaltending statistics

Rankings

USCHO did not release a poll in week 20.

2021 NHL Entry Draft

† incoming freshman

References

Vermont Catamounts men's ice hockey seasons
Vermont Catamounts
Vermont Catamounts
Vermont Catamounts
2021 in sports in Vermont
2020 in sports in Vermont